Clinidium curvatum is a species of ground beetle in the subfamily Rhysodinae. It was described by R.T. Bell & J.R. Bell in 1985. It is known from Oroque in Norte de Santander Department, Colombia.

References

Clinidium
Beetles of South America
Arthropods of Colombia
Endemic fauna of Colombia
Beetles described in 1985